Cedar Grove may refer to:

Towns, cities, and neighborhoods

United States
Cedar Grove, El Dorado County, California
Cedar Grove, Fresno County, California
Cedar Grove, Florida
Cedar Grove, Laurens County, Georgia
Cedar Grove, Walker County, Georgia
Cedar Grove, Indiana
Cedar Grove, Bullitt County, Kentucky
Cedar Grove, Shreveport, Louisiana
Cedar Grove, Mississippi
Cedargrove, Missouri
Cedar Grove, Mercer County, New Jersey
Cedar Grove, Essex County, New Jersey
Cedar Grove, New Mexico
Cedar Grove, Orange County, North Carolina
Cedar Grove, Randolph County, North Carolina
Cedar Grove, Tennessee (disambiguation), several places
Cedar Grove, Texas
Cedar Grove, Frederick County, Virginia
Cedar Grove, West Virginia
Cedar Grove, Wisconsin

Elsewhere
Cedar Grove, Antigua and Barbuda, on the island of Antigua
Cedar Grove, Queensland, Australia
Cedar Grove, Ontario, Canada

Buildings and other properties

Australia
Cedar Grove Weir, on the Logan River, Queensland

United States
Cedar Grove Plantation, a historic plantation house near Faunsdale, Alabama
Susina Plantation, a historic plantation house also known as Cedar Grove, near Thomasville, Georgia
Cedar Grove (Baltimore, Maryland), a historic home
Cedar Grove (La Plata, Maryland), a historic home
Cedar Grove (Williamsport, Maryland), a historic home
Thomas Cole House or Cedar Grove, a National Historic Landmark that includes the home and the studio of painter Thomas Cole
Cedar Grove (Oak Grove, Kentucky), listed on the National Register of Historic Places in Christian County, Kentucky
Cedar Grove (Franklin, Missouri), a historic home
Cedar Grove (Natchez, Mississippi), a historic plantation house
Cedar Grove (Vicksburg, Mississippi), listed on the National Register of Historic Places in Warren County, Mississippi
Cedar Grove Place,  a historic building in Church Hill, Mississippi
Cedar Grove (Huntersville, North Carolina), a historic plantation house
Cedar Grove Mansion, a historic home in Philadelphia
Cedar Grove (Edgefield, South Carolina), a historic plantation house
Cedar Grove (Brownsville, Tennessee), a historic cottage
Cedar Grove (Clarksville, Virginia), a historic plantation house
Cedar Grove (Halifax County, Virginia), a historic farm property
Cedar Grove (Providence Forge, Virginia), a historic plantation house
Cedar Grove (Cedar Grove, West Virginia), a historic home

Organizations
Cedar Grove Productions, a media production company in Los Angeles, California
Cedar Grove OnStage, a theatre organization in Los Angeles, California

Transportation
Cedar Grove station, in Boston, Massachusetts, United States
Cedar Grove Transit Station, in Eagan, Minnesota, United States

Other uses
Cedar Grove (album)
Cedar Grove Cemetery (disambiguation)
Cedar Grove High School (disambiguation)
Cedar Grove Elementary, an elementary school in Williamston, South Carolina